The index of physics articles is split into multiple pages due to its size.

To navigate by individual letter use the table of contents below.

I

I. M. Dharmadasa
IBM Zurich Research Laboratory
ICARUS (experiment)
ICRANet
IEEE Antennas & Propagation Society
IEEE Antennas and Wireless Propagation Letters
IEEE Council on Superconductivity
IEEE Electron Devices Society
IEEE Fellow
IEEE Journal of Quantum Electronics
IEEE Journal of Selected Topics in Quantum Electronics
IEEE Marie Sklodowska-Curie Award
IEEE Microwave Magazine
IEEE Microwave and Guided Wave Letters
IEEE Microwave and Wireless Components Letters
IEEE Nikola Tesla Award
IEEE Photonics Award
IEEE Transactions on Antennas and Propagation
IEEE Transactions on Applied Superconductivity
IEEE Transactions on Electron Devices
IEEE Transactions on Microwave Theory and Techniques
IEEE Transactions on Semiconductor Manufacturing
IFAE
IGNITOR
II-VI semiconductor
IKAROS
INAF
INDO
IR/UV mixing
ISABELLE
ISIS neutron source
ISKRA lasers
ISOLDE
ISOLTRAP
ISO 31
ISO 31-13
ISO 31-2
ISO 31-3
ISO 31-4
ISO 31-5
ISO 31-6
ISO 31-7
ISO 31-8
ISO 31-9
ITER
IZMIRAN
Ian Fells
Ian G. Enting
Ian Grant (physicist)
Ice
IceCube Neutrino Observatory
Ice II
Ice III
Ice IX
Ice Ic
Ice Ih
Ice VII
Ice VIII
Ice XI
Ice XII
Ice XV
Ice crystals
Ice nucleus
Ice rules
Ichiji Tasaki
Ida Noddack
Ideal gas
Ideal gas law
Ideal solution
Ideally hard superconductor
Identical particles
IEEE Microwave and Guided Wave Letters
Igal Talmi
Ignace-Gaston Pardies
Ignacij Klemenčič
Igor Dmitriyevich Novikov
Igor Klebanov
Igor Kurchatov
Igor Sutyagin
Igor Tamm
Igor Ternov
Il Cimento
Il Nuovo Cimento
Il Nuovo Cimento A
Il Nuovo Cimento B
Il Nuovo Cimento C
Il Nuovo Cimento D
Ille Gebeshuber
Illuminance
Ilya Frank
Ilya Lifshitz
Ilya Prigogine
Image-based flow visualization
Image noise
Imaginary time
Imaging spectrometer
Imbert–Fedorov effect
Immersed boundary method
Immersion lithography
Immirzi parameter
Immittance
Immunophysics
Impact (mechanics)
Impact ionization
Impact parameter
Impact pressure
Impedance of different devices (derivations)
Impedance of free space
Impeller
Implicate and explicate order according to David Bohm
Implosion (mechanical process)
Impulse (physics)
InHour
In Search of Schrödinger's Cat
Incandescence
Inch of water
Incoherent scatter
Incompatible observables
Incompleteness of quantum physics
Incompressible flow
Independent electron approximation
Index-matching material
Index of engineering science and mechanics articles
Index of optics articles
Index of physics articles
Index of radiation articles
India-based Neutrino Observatory
Indian National Physics Olympiad
Indian Physical Society
Indicator diagram
Indira Gandhi Centre for Atomic Research
Indium arsenide antimonide phosphide
Indium gallium arsenide
Indium gallium phosphide
Indium nitride
Induced gamma emission
Induced gravity
Induced metric
Inductance
Induction heating
Inductive charging
Inductive coupling
Inductively coupled plasma
Inductively coupled plasma atomic emission spectroscopy
Inductively coupled plasma mass spectrometry
Industrial radiography
Inelastic collision
Inelastic mean free path
Inelastic scattering
Inert pair effect
Inertance
Inertia
Inertia coupling
Inertia negation
Inertia wheel pendulum
Inertial confinement fusion
Inertial electrostatic confinement
Inertial frame of reference
Inertial fusion power plant
Inertial space
Inertial wave
Inexact differential
Infiltration (hydrology)
Infinitesimal strain theory
Infinity correction
Infinity focus
Inflation (cosmology)
Inflationary epoch
Inflaton
Information processing
Infragravity wave
Infralateral arc
Infraparticle
Infrared
Infrared Physics and Technology
Infrared cut-off filter
Infrared divergence
Infrared fixed point
Infrared multiphoton dissociation
Infrared thermometer
Infrared window
Infrasound
Inge Lehmann
Inge Schmitz-Feuerhake
Inglis–Teller equation
Ingrid Daubechies
Inhomogeneous
Inhomogeneous electromagnetic wave equation
Initial mass function
Initial singularity
Initial stability
Initial value formulation (general relativity)
Injection kicker magnets
Injection seeder
Injector
Insect flight
Insertion device
Insertion time
Inspiral
Inspirator
Instability
Instant
Instant Physics
Instant centre of rotation
Instantaneous acceleration
Instanton
Instanton fluid
Institut Laue–Langevin
Institut d'astrophysique de Paris
Institut de Physique du Globe de Paris
Institute for High Energy Physics
Institute for Nuclear Research
Institute for Physical Problems
Institute for Plasma Research
Institute for Quantum Computing
Institute for Radium Research, Vienna
Institute for Science and International Security
Institute for Telecommunication Sciences
Institute for Transuranium Elements
Institute of Acoustics, Chinese Academy of Sciences
Institute of Acoustics (United Kingdom)
Institute of Astronomy of the Russian Academy of Sciences
Institute of Atmospheric Physics AS CR
Institute of Electrical and Electronics Engineers
Institute of High Energy Physics
Institute of Physics
Institute of Physics and Engineering in Medicine
Institute of Sound and Vibration Research
Institute of Space Physics (Sweden)
Instituto de Plasmas e Fusão Nuclear
Integrable system
Integral of motion
Integrated fluidic circuit
Integrated optical circuit
Integrating sphere
Intense Pulsed Neutron Source
Intensity (physics)
Intensive and extensive properties
Interacting boson model
Interaction
Interaction-free measurement
Interaction energy
Interaction picture
Interaction point
Interface conditions for electromagnetic fields
Interference (wave propagation)
Interference filter
Interferometric gravitational wave detector
Interferometry
Intermediate-mass black hole
Intermittency
Intermodulation
Intermodulation interference
Intermolecular force
Internal conversion
Internal conversion coefficient
Internal energy
Internal flow
Internal gravity waves
Internal rotary inspection system
Internal wave
International Academy of Astronautics
International Aerospace Abstracts
International Association of Mathematical Physics
International Centre for Diffraction Data
International Centre for Synchrotron-Light for Experimental Science Applications in the Middle East
International Commission for Optics
International Commission on Non-Ionizing Radiation Protection
International Conference on Differential Geometric Methods in Theoretical Physics
International Conference on High Energy Physics
International Conference on Photonic, Electronic and Atomic Collisions
International Conference on the Physics of Semiconductors
International Congress on Mathematical Physics
International Cosmic Ray Conference
International Fusion Materials Irradiation Facility
International Geomagnetic Reference Field
International Heliophysical Year
International Journal for Numerical Methods in Fluids
International Journal of Geometric Methods in Modern Physics
International Journal of Modern Physics
International Journal of Modern Physics A
International Journal of Modern Physics B
International Journal of Modern Physics C
International Journal of Modern Physics D
International Journal of Modern Physics E
International Journal of Nanoscience
International Journal of Theoretical Physics
International Linear Collider
International Liquid Crystal Society
International Muon Ionization Cooling Experiment
International Nathiagali Summer College on Physics
International Physics Olympiad
International Society on General Relativity and Gravitation
International Standard Atmosphere
International System of Units
International Union of Geodesy and Geophysics
International conference on Physics of Light–Matter Coupling in Nanostructures
Interplanetary medium
Interplanetary scintillation
Interplanetary Transport Network
Interpretations of quantum mechanics
Intersecting Storage Rings
Interstellar travel
Intersubband polariton
Interval (time)
Intrabeam scattering
Intracule
Intrinsic hyperpolarizability
Intrinsic impedance
Intrinsic redshift
Intrinsic semiconductor
Intrinsic viscosity
Introduction to Dirac's constant
Introduction to M-theory
Introduction to angular momentum
Introduction to eigenstates
Introduction to entropy
Introduction to gauge theory
Introduction to general relativity
Introduction to particles
Introduction to quantum mechanics
Introduction to special relativity
Introduction to the mathematics of general relativity
Invariant (physics)
Invariant interval
Invariant latitude
Invariant mass
Invariant measure
Invariant speed
Invention of radio
Inverse Doppler effect
Inverse Faraday effect
Inverse Problems
Inverse Raman effect
Inverse dynamics
Inverse gas chromatography
Inverse magnetostrictive effect
Inverse scattering problem
Inverse scattering transform
Inverse temperature
Inversion temperature
Inversion transformation
Inverted microscope
Inverted pendulum
Inviscid flow
Ioffe Institute
Ion-mobility spectrometry
Ion acoustic wave
Ion beam
Ion drift meter
Ion laser
Ion notation
Ion optics
Ion source
Ion thruster
Ion track
Ion trap
Ion wind
Ionic liquid piston compressor
Ionic polarization
Ionic potential
Ionising Radiations Regulations 1999
Ionization
Ionization chamber
Ionization cooling
Ionization energy
Ionization gauge
Ionized-air glow
Ionizing radiation
Ionocraft
Ionogram
Ionosonde
Ionosphere
Ionospheric heater
Ionospheric pierce point
Ionospheric storm
Iosif Khriplovich
Iraj Malekpour
Iranian Journal of Physics Research
Iron oxide nanoparticles
Iron peak
Irradiance
Irradiation
Irreversible process
Irvine Clifton Gardner
Irvine–Michigan–Brookhaven (detector)
Irving C. Gardner
Irving Langmuir
Irwin G. Priest
Isaac Abella
Isaac Chuang
Isaac Newton
Isaac Newton Medal
Isaac Starr
Isaak Kikoin
Isaak Markovich Khalatnikov
Isaak Pomeranchuk
Isabella Karle
Isenthalpic process
Isentropic process
Ishfaq Ahmad
Ishrat Hussain Usmani
Isidor Isaac Rabi
Isidor Sauers
Ising critical exponents
Ising model
Island growth
Island of inversion
Island of stability
Ismail Akbay
İsmail Hakkı Duru
Isobaric process
Isochoic wave
Isochoric process
Isochronous cyclotron
Isoclinic line
Isodiapher
Isodynamic line
Isoenthalpic process
Isoenthalpic–isobaric ensemble
Isogon (geomagnetism)
Isolated system
Isolation booth
Isolator (microwave)
Isomeric nuclide
Isomeric shift
Isomeric transition
Isopleths
Isopotential map
Isoscalar
Isospin
Isothermal flow
Isothermal process
Isothermal titration calorimetry
Isothermal–isobaric ensemble
Isotone
Isotope
Isotope-ratio mass spectrometry
Isotope analysis
Isotope geochemistry
Isotope separation
Isotopic abundance
Isotopic ratio
Isotopic shift
Isotopically pure diamond
Isotropic coordinates
Isotropic radiation
Isotropic radiator
Isovector
Istituto Nazionale di Fisica Nucleare
Italian Physical Society
Itzhak Bars
Ivan A. Getting
Ivan K. Schuller
Ivan Pulyui
Ivan Supek
Ivan Wilhelm
Ivar Giaever
Ivar Waller
Ives–Stilwell experiment
Iwahashi Zenbei
Izuo Hayashi

Indexes of physics articles